The President of Rutgers, The State University of New Jersey (informally called Rutgers University)  is the chief administrator of Rutgers, The State University of New Jersey.  Rutgers was founded by clergymen affiliated with the Dutch Reformed Church in 1766 as Queen's College and was the eighth-oldest of nine colleges established during the American colonial period.  Before 1956, Rutgers was a small liberal arts college and became a full university in 1924 with the offering of graduate degree programs and the establishment of professional schools. Today, Rutgers is a public research university with three campuses in the state located in New Brunswick and Piscataway, Newark, and Camden.  The state's flagship university with approximately 65,000 students and employing 20,000 faculty and staff members, Rutgers is the largest institution for higher education in New Jersey.

Since 1785, twenty one men have served as the institution's president, beginning with the Reverend Jacob Rutsen Hardenbergh, a Dutch Reformed clergyman who was responsible for establishing the college. Before 1930, most of the university's presidents were clergymen affiliated with Christian denominations in the Reformed tradition (either Dutch or German Reformed, or Presbyterian). Two presidents were alumni of Rutgers College—the Rev. William H. S. Demarest (Class of 1883) and Philip Milledoler Brett (Class of 1892). The current president Dr. Jonathan Holloway, who became the university's twenty-first president on July 1, 2020. Dr. Holloway, who is African American, is the first person of color to lead Rutgers University.

The president serves in an ex officio capacity as a presiding officer within the University's 59-member board of trustees and its eleven-member board of governors, and is appointed by these boards to oversee day-to-day operations of the University across its three campuses.  He is charged with implementing "board policies with the help and advice of senior administrators and other members of the university community." The president is responsible only to those two governing boards—there is no oversight by state officials.  Frequently, the president also occupies a professorship in his academic discipline and engages in instructing students.

Presidents of Rutgers University
The following twenty individuals have served as president of Rutgers University from the creation of the office in 1785 to the present. Those marked with their names in bold had graduated from Rutgers. Those marked with "↑" died in office. Where years don't overlap there was a gap of a few months while a suitable candidate was found, this usually occurred when someone died in office, or left unexpectedly to accept another position.

Presidents of Queen's College (1785–1825)

Rutgers was founded as Queen's College on November 10, 1766, and is the eighth-oldest college in the United States and one of the nine Colonial Colleges founded before the American Revolution.  The university is one of only two colonial colleges that later became public universities.

In the early days of Queen's College, the trustees wrote to the church's leadership in Amsterdam and at the University of Utrecht to seek candidates for the position of president.  In their correspondence, they expressed a wish that a prospective college president possess the following characteristics:
 (1) he was to fill the office of professor of theology, 
 (2) to oversee the instruction in languages through tutors until professors could be secured, 
 (3) to do more or less the work of a minister on the Lord’s Day, 
 (4) to be a man of tried piety, 
 (5) to be attached to the Constitution of the Netherlands Church, 
 (6) to be a man of thorough learning, 
 (7) to be good natured, 
 (8) to be free and friendly in conversation, 
 (9) to be master of the English language, and 
 (10) to be pleased to lecture on Marckii Medulla Theologiae Christianae.

Its early history, Rutgers was closely allied with the Dutch Reformed Synod of New York which oversaw financial transactions and early selections of professors for Queen's College and the New Brunswick Theological Seminary. The Rev. John Henry Livingston (1746–1825), who served as the college's fourth president and was responsible for establishing the New Brunswick Theological Seminary, was instrumental in raising funds to support the school after several years of being closed resulting from economic difficulties. Just before his death, Livingston raised enough donations and support to place the school on more stable financial footing, including arranging for a generous donation in 1825 from Colonel Henry Rutgers (1745–1830), a wealthy landowner and former Revolutionary War officer from New York City.  The trustees of the school renamed the school in honour of Colonel Rutgers in that year.

Presidents of Rutgers College (1825–1924)

Presidents of Rutgers University (1924–1945)

Presidents of Rutgers, The State University of New Jersey (1945–present)

References

Notes

Citations

External links
 Rutgers University
 Office of the President of Rutgers University

Lists of people by university or college in New Jersey
Lists of university and college leaders